The Living Room Sessions, is an album by American jazz musicians David Grisman, Frank Vignola, Robin Nolan and Michael Papillo.

Track listing
 Claire de Lune 6:16
 Black Orpheus 5:38
 September Song 4:07
 Sway With Me 8:20
 Dawg Waltz 6:57
 Swing Gitan 5:35
 Tears 6:54
 Premier Guitar 7:22
 Autumn Leaves

Personnel
David Grisman - mandolin
Frank Vignola - guitar
Robin Nolan - guitar
Michael Papillo - bass

References

David Grisman albums
2007 albums
Acoustic Disc albums